This list of museums in Iowa is a list of museums, defined for this context as institutions (including nonprofit organizations, government entities, and private businesses) that collect and care for objects of cultural, artistic, scientific, or historical interest and make their collections or related exhibits available for public viewing. Museums that exist only in cyberspace (i.e., virtual museums) are not included.

Museums

Defunct museums
 George Wyth House, Cedar Falls, formerly operated by the Cedar Falls Historical Society, sold in 2014
 Hometown Perry, Iowa, Perry, Iowa, closed December 31, 2055website
 Linn-Olson Museum, Villisca, contents auctioned off in 2012
 Minerville Country Village, Donnellson
 Museum of Religious Arts, Logan, closed in 2016
 Science Center, Cedar Rapids, closed in 2015
 Schield International Museum, Waverly, closed in 2009

See also
 Museums list
 List of nature centers in Iowa

Resources
 Iowa Museum Association
 Historic House Museums in Iowa
 Historical Museums in Iowa

References

Museums
Iowa
Museums